"The Night We Burned Ardoyne" is an Ulster loyalist song.

It refers to the events of August 1969 when there were large-scale attacks in Ardoyne, a largely Catholic/Irish nationalist area in north Belfast, which saw many houses burnt out.

It is sung to the tune of "Forty Shades of Green".

It has been recorded on CD by The Blue Notes and The Thornlie Boys.

Lyrics

References

 Lyrics from Scottish loyalist website
 Video from Loyalist Media "The Night We Burnt Ardoyne—Reason why..."

1969 in Northern Ireland
Northern Irish songs
Ulster loyalism
The Troubles in Belfast